"Game over" is a message in video games which signals to the player that the game and an attempt of playing the level has ended. It is usually received negatively in a situation where continued play is disallowed, such as losing all of one's lives or failing a critical objective. However, it sometimes also appears after the successful completion of a game, usually ones designed for arcades. The phrase has since been turned into quasi-slang, usually describing an event that will cause significant harm, injury, bad luck, or even death to a person.

History
The phrase was used as early as 1950 in devices such as electro-mechanical pinball machines, which would light up the phrase with a lamp (lightbulb). Before the advent of home consoles and personal computing, arcades were the predominant platform for playing games, which required users to deposit a token or coin into an arcade game machine to play. Most early arcade video games typically had the game end when a timer ran out, with shoot 'em up game Space Invaders (1978) later popularizing a game over triggered by the player getting killed by enemies (either by being shot or enemies reaching the player), with the player given a finite number of lives before the game ends.

During the golden age of arcade video games, players would usually be given a finite number of lives (or attempts) to progress through the game, the exhaustion of which would usually result in the display of the message "Game over" indicating that the game had ended. The phrase might also be followed by the message "Play Again?" and a prompt asking the player to insert additional tokens to prevent the game from terminating and instead allowing the player to continue their progress. The message can also be seen flashing on certain arcade games while in attract mode, until a player inserts a credit; at this point the message would change to the number of credits inserted and "Press 1 or 2 player start", or some variation thereof.

As these games were ported to home consoles, the "Game over" screen and "Continue?" prompt remained, but often required only the press of a button to keep the game going; while the video game industry shifted away from being arcade-focused to being home gaming-focused, the inclusion of such a screen was no longer as critical since it offered no financial benefit. However, the concept of Game Over remained imbued in the medium thereafter as a way to add an element of risk: a player who is unsuccessful at carrying out the game's objective (possibly repeatedly) will be faced with such a screen and be forced to start over from either the beginning of the game or a previous, saved state.

Certain games ask players with no more lives to continue or to choose "game over" in a menu. In case "game over" is on top of "continue", any cursor would have to be properly positioned to get the desired choice.

With the development of the aforementioned save function (complemented by the less popular password system, which is now seen as archaic), the Game Over message has become less common as players are allowed to respawn at a previous state of the game, which has been stored in memory either through a player deliberately saving the game or reaching a checkpoint (which causes the game to save automatically). Many modern games do not technically "end" until they are completed, and although "Game over" screens remain present in many of them in some form or another, it is uncommon for them to signify a forced return to the beginning of the game, and only marginally more common for them to signify a substantial loss of progress. Roguelikes are the most common exception to this rule; permadeath is often a staple of the genre.

"Game over" has seen many variations. For instance in Little King's Story, the message "LIFE OVER" appears upon the death of the player's character. Nights into Dreams... and Nights: Journey of Dreams use "NIGHT OVER". Antarctic Adventure and Sonic the Hedgehog use "TIME OVER". Screens that display at equivalent points are considered "Game over" screens, even if the message that is displayed is entirely different, such as "YOU ARE DEAD" used in Resident Evil, God of War, and Left 4 Dead. "YOU DIED" seen in Dark Souls, Cuphead, and Minecraft. "GOOD NIGHT" seen in Klonoa and Luigi's Mansion. The 2020 Nintendo 3DS game The Queen TV-Game 2 uses "FUCK" to parody player frustration. The 1980 arcade game Missile Command uses "The End", a game over screen that is usually seen upon achieving victory. Another variation includes "THE WITCH HUNTS ARE OVER" used in the Bayonetta series.

Some games have a number of different "Game over" screens which are specific to game mode, level, or situation. These are called "non-standard game over screens", and often are the result of failing to achieve certain objectives of a particular level or game mode. Examples include the non-standard game over messages in Plants vs. Zombies which are "All your pet zombies have perished!" in Zombiquarium, "You lost all your zombies!" in I, Zombie, "You survived for (number of flags that the player has completed) before dying a gruesome zombie death!!!" in Survival Mode, "You made it to a streak of (number of streaks that the player has completed)" in I, Zombie Endless and Vasebreaker Endless, and "You survived for (number of flags that the player has completed)!!" in Last Stand.

Outside video gaming

The phrase is occasionally used to indicate the end of an argument or process in real life. In January 2011, protesters and rioters in several North African and Middle Eastern countries used the slogan "Game over" on banners to express their anti-government sentiments.

"Game over" is also sometimes used as a phrase to concede defeat, as for example in the movie Aliens where one of the protagonists, Private William Hudson (Bill Paxton), shouts, "Game over, man. Game over!" after the dropship meant to rescue him and his expedition is destroyed. Paxton's use of the phrase was included in shortened form in the SNES game adaptation of Alien 3, although the Hudson character did not appear in the film. The "Game Over" quote is heard in full after the final ball is drained in Zen Studios' virtual pinball adaptation of Aliens. The "game over" line was not in the Aliens script, but was ad libbed by Paxton.

The phrase is also used various times in the Saw movie series, because of the antagonist's penchant for referring to the traps he creates as "games".

In the movie Scott Pilgrim vs. the World, the character Scott strums the 'Game Over' tune from the classic video game Super Mario World.

Some gamebooks utilize this phrase as well. Each book in the Nintendo Adventure Book series has only one good ending, with all of the bad ones saying "Game Over".

See also

1-up
Continue (video gaming)
Saved game
Branching storylines in videogames
Kill screen

References

Video game gameplay
English phrases
Video game culture
Video game terminology
1950s neologisms